Aetholopus lumawigi is a species of beetle in the family Cerambycidae. It was described by Masao Hayashi in 1976. It is known from the Philippines.

References

Xylorhizini
Beetles described in 1976